The 1929 Michigan State Normal Hurons football team represented Michigan State Normal College (later renamed Eastern Michigan University) during the 1929 college football season.  In their eighth season under head coach Elton Rynearson, the Hurons compiled a record of 5–1–2 (2–0–1 against conference opponents), won the Michigan Collegiate Conference championship, and outscored their opponents by a combined total of 156 to 45. Wilbur L. Gunnerson was the team captain.  The team played its home games at Normal Field on the school's campus in Ypsilanti, Michigan.

Schedule

References

Michigan State Normal
Eastern Michigan Eagles football seasons
Michigan Collegiate Conference football champion seasons
Michigan State Normal Hurons football